The Yapurarra or Jaburara, also rendered Yaburara, are an Aboriginal Australian people whose traditional lands are in the Pilbara region of Western Australia and the Dampier Archipelago.

Language
The Jaburara language (Yaburarra) is thought to have been similar to Ngarluma, part of the Ngayarda languages.

Country

Early contact
The intermediary used was the ship's interpreter Bungaree, who, speaking the Broken Bay Dharug language could not understand them, but managed to calm their anxieties by undressing and showing he wore ritual scars.

Resistance and extinction
The Jaburara, together with other local tribes such as the Ngarluma and Mardu-Dunera fought against the colonization of their lands by white settlers. According to an American whaler at the time, the law that accompanied settlement in their region could be summed up as "a word and a blow: the blow, which is generally fatal, coming first". In 1868, near the present-day township of Roebourne, in an area known in the local language as Murujuga (hip bone sticking out), two policemen and a native tracker had been killed. The suspects, three Jaburara men, were duly caught and sentenced to imprisonment. Two parties, made up of north coast pearlers and settler pastoralists had been given permission by the district authority to apply lethal force "with discretion and judgement", and they attacked Jaburara encampments in a pincer movement. In what is now known as the Flying Foam massacre it has been estimated that up to 60 Jaburara were killed. In one camp alone, some 15 were killed. Following the La Grange massacre, this episode constitutes the second known example of the use of massacre to forcibly remove an indigenous north Western population. One small "family" was recorded in the first half of the 20th century as still surviving but the massacre effectively cut off the tribe's connections to the islands.

Heritage
The Jaburara heritage is attested by rock quarries, extensive archaic petroglyphs, grindstones used by native women to make flour from native seeds, nomadic camps, and middens to be found along the Jaburara Heritage Trail, which winds through an area containing some of the most extensive remains of ancient Aboriginal rock art, some dating back 25,000 years.

Alternative names
 Jaburara-ngaluma (northern Ngaluma)
 Jaburrara-ngarluma
 Madoitja (perhaps)

Notes and references

Notes

References

External links

Aboriginal peoples of Western Australia
Extinct languages of Western Australia
Western Australia
History of Western Australia
Ngayarda languages